The 1974–75 season was Newport County's 13th consecutive season in the Football League Fourth Division since relegation at the end of the 1961–62 season and their 47th overall in the Football League.

Season review
County wore a plain tangerine and black kit until changing to a shirt with two wide shoulder stripes in early 1975 (listed as third kit here).

Results summary

Results by round

Fixtures and results

Fourth Division

FA Cup

Football League Cup

League table

References

 Amber in the Blood: A History of Newport County.

External links
 Newport County 1974-1975 : Results
 Newport County football club match record: 1975
 Welsh Cup 1974/75

1974-75
English football clubs 1974–75 season
1974–75 in Welsh football
1974–75 in English football